2MASS J05325346+8246465 (abbreviated 2MASS J0532+8246) is possibly the first brown dwarf observed in the galactic halo of the Milky Way, and the first known substellar subdwarf star. It was discovered from Two Micron All-Sky Survey data, and verified by observations at Palomar Observatory and W. M. Keck Observatory. It has a low metallicity, which indicates it is an old star.

The mass and temperature of 2MASS 0532+8246 makes it a rare object in stellar-substellar gap between conventional stars and brown dwarfs. It produces roughly half of its luminosity from hydrogen fusion. Such "gap" objects, covering a narrow range of masses but a wide range of temperatures, and powered by unsteady hydrogen fusion, are exotic but expected to be more common among low-metallicity objects like 2MASS J05325346+8246465.

References

External links
Entry at DwarfArchives.org 

Camelopardalis (constellation)
Brown dwarfs
L-type stars
J05325346+8246465
Free-floating substellar objects